The 2013 China Masters Super Series will be the seventh super series tournament of the 2013 BWF Super Series. The tournament will be held in Changzhou, China from 10–15 September 2013 and will have a total purse of $250,000.

Men's singles

Seeds

  Chen Long
  Du Pengyu
  Boonsak Ponsana
  Tommy Sugiarto
  Kenichi Tago
  Jan Ø. Jørgensen
  Wang Zhengming
  Takuma Ueda

Top half

Bottom half

Finals

Women's singles

Seeds

  Li Xuerui
  Ratchanok Intanon
  Wang Yihan
  Sung Ji-hyun
  Wang Shixian
  Tai Tzu-ying
  Minatsu Mitani
  Bae Youn-joo

Top half

Bottom half

Finals

Men's doubles

Seeds

  Ko Sung-hyun / Lee Yong-dae
  Hiroyuki Endo / Kenichi Hayakawa
  Kim Ki-jung / Kim Sa-rang
  Liu Xiaolong / Qiu Zihan
  Cai Yun / Fu Haifeng
  Shin Baek-cheol / Yoo Yeon-seong
  Mohd Zakry Abdul Latif / Mohd Fairuzizuan Mohd Tazari
  Hirokatsu Hashimoto / Noriyasu Hirata

Top half

Bottom half

Finals

Women's doubles

Seeds

  Wang Xiaoli / Yu Yang
  Ma Jin / Tang Jinhua
  Misaki Matsutomo / Ayaka Takahashi
  Pia Zebadiah Bernadeth / Rizki Amelia Pradipta
  Bao Yixin / Zhong Qianxin
  Jung Kyung-eun / Kim Ha-na
  Duanganong Aroonkesorn / Kunchala Voravichitchaikul
  Reika Kakiiwa / Miyuki Maeda

Top half

Bottom half

Finals

Mixed doubles

Seeds

  Xu Chen / Ma Jin
  Zhang Nan / Zhao Yunlei
  Sudket Prapakamol / Saralee Thoungthongkam
  Markis Kido / Pia Zebadiah Bernadeth
  Ko Sung-hyun / Kim Ha-na
  Riky Widianto / Puspita Richi Dili
  Shin Baek-cheol / Jang Ye-na
  Anders Kristiansen / Julie Houmann

Top half

Bottom half

Finals

References 

2013 China Masters Super Series
Masters Super Series
Chinese Masters